is a 1961 jidaigeki novel by Ryōtarō Shiba (the author of Fukurō no Shiro). It has been adapted into a 1960-1961 TV series and a Toei Company 1964 color chanbara film under the same title, directed by Tai Kato.

Story 

The film tells the story of a womanizing ninja named Nabari Shinzo (Hashizo Okawa) during the Tokugawa shogunate. Hired for a mission by the government, Shinzo soon finds himself in the center of a multi-sided intrigue, surrounded by double agents and fighting for the woman he loves (Hiroko Sakuramachi as Chino) against a treacherous ronin rival.

DVD release 

A remastered version of the film has been released on a DVD by Toei Video in Japan in 2006 (in 16:9 widescreen version with a trailer and photo gallery special features). The film has been later imported to U.S. with English subtitles under the title Warrior of the Wind (not to be confused with Warriors of the Wind).

References

External links 

 
 Beauty and humanity in KAZE NO BUSHI - Vintage Ninja

1961 Japanese novels
1964 films
Films based on Japanese novels
Films based on romance novels
Films directed by Tai Kato
1960s Japanese-language films
Japanese novels adapted into films
Jidaigeki
Jidaigeki films
Ninja films
1964 romantic drama films
Samurai films
Toei Company films
1960s Japanese films